Government Degree College Naguman is a public sector degree college located in Naguman Peshawar, Khyber Pakhtunkhwa in Pakistan. The college is affiliated with University of Peshawar for its degree programs.

Overview & History 
Government degree college Naguman Peshawar was established by KP Provincial Government during 2012-2013. It is situated in the village of Naguman on the outskirts of Peshawar city. The campus of the college is spread over 40 Kanals of land. The campus currently houses an Administrative Block, Academic Block, Food Court, Auditorium, Playgrounds, Central Library, Laboratories, Computer Labs, Staff Hostel and Parking Facilities.

Departments And Faculties 
The college currently has the following departments and faculties.

Social Sciences/Humanities
 Department of Pakistan Studies
 Department of English
 Department of Economics
 Department of Geography
 Department of Health & Physical Education
 Department of History
 Department of Arabic And Islamiyat
 Department of Law
 Department of Urdu
 Department of Political Science
 Department of Pashto

Physical Sciences
 Department of Chemistry
 Department of Computer Science
 Department of Mathematics
 Department of Physics
 Department of Statistics

Biological Sciences
 Department of Botany
 Department of Zoology

See also  
 Edwardes College Peshawar
 Islamia College Peshawar
 Government College Peshawar
 Government Superior Science College Peshawar
 Government College Hayatabad Peshawar
 Government Degree College Naguman Peshawar
 Government Degree College Mathra Peshawar
 Government Degree College Badaber Peshawar
 Government Degree College Chagarmatti Peshawar
 Government Degree College Wadpagga Peshawar
 Government Degree College Achyni Payan Peshawar

References

External links 
 Government Degree College Naguman Peshawar Official Website

Colleges in Peshawar
Universities and colleges in Peshawar